The Toledo Cherokee are a junior ice hockey team in the United States Premier Hockey League (USPHL) as part of the Premier Division. The team plays their home games at the Team Toledo Ice House in Toledo, Ohio. The team is coached by Kenny Miller since 2012.

History
Before moving to Tier III Junior A hockey, the Cherokee competed in Junior B hockey, the team won the Junior B National Championship in 1998. The team was founded in the Central States Hockey League (CSHL) in 1993. In 2010, the CSHL became the North American 3 Hockey League (NA3HL). The Cherokee left the NA3HL in 2018 for the Premier Division of the United States Premier Hockey League, a non-sanctioned league.

Alumni
The Cherokee have produced a number of alumni playing in higher levels of junior hockey, NCAA and ACHA college programs, and professional hockey.

 Adam Edinger — 5th round draft pick by New York Islanders, played for the Bloomington Prairie Thunder (IHL)

References

External links
 Official Site

Sports teams in Toledo, Ohio
Ice hockey teams in Ohio
1993 establishments in Ohio
Ice hockey clubs established in 1993